Kaw River State Park is a state park in Topeka, Kansas, USA. The property was donated to the state in 2005 and officially opened to the public on September 4, 2010, making it the most recent unit of the Kansas State Park service.

Located on the bank of the Kansas River in Topeka, the Kaw River State Park is located adjacent and west of Cedar Crest (location of the Kansas Governor's mansion, and the well developed  MacLennan Park) and just NE of the Kansas Wildlife & Parks Region 2 Office.  To the west of the Kaw River State Park there are additional developed trails with some extreme terrain, however, this is posted private land and the owners have asked the public to stay out.

History
The trails were known to many locals as the Menninger trails, as they were part of the famous mental health hospital which was the former owner of the land.  After Menniger's left town in 2003, the complex was purchased by St. Francis Health Care who, in 2005, donated the heavily wooded bluffs behind the hospital to the state of Kansas.  The original development of the trails can be attributed to Menniger's.  Following their departure the Kansas Trails Council maintained and developed the trails, along with the adjacent MacLennan Park trails.  Jeffery Bender, the park's manager, began developing the park in January 2008. Prior to this, Jeffery Bender worked with the National Park Service in several western National Parks. On September 4, 2010, the park officially opened. On that day, visitors could participate in a Kaw River Run. At 10:30 a.m., Kansas Governor Mark Parkinson and his wife dedicated the park which already boasted a new paved road providing one of the only Kaw river access points near Topeka, two new parking lots, new gravel trails to the west of the access road, and new signage.

See also
 List of Kansas state parks
 List of lakes, reservoirs, and dams in Kansas
 List of rivers of Kansas

External links

State parks of Kansas
Protected areas of Shawnee County, Kansas
Protected areas established in 2010
Tourist attractions in Topeka, Kansas
2010 establishments in Kansas